Isperih is a town in northeastern Bulgaria, part of Razgrad Province, situated in the central part of the Ludogorie region. It is the administrative centre of the eponymous Isperih Municipality. As of December 2009, the town has a population of 9,017 inhabitants.

Isperih was called Kemallar during the Ottoman rule of Bulgaria and was later renamed in honour of Bulgarian khan Asparuh, whose name in Slavic was Isperih.

The town has a mixed population of Bulgarians and Turks, with an Orthodox church and a mosque being present. Isperih emerged in 1545 at the place of a medieval settlement, with the earliest known traces of human presence in the area dating from the Bronze Age. The village was first mentioned as Kemallar in an Ottoman tax register from 1573 and was renamed Isperih in 1934, becoming a town on 31 January 1960.

The Thracian Tomb of Sveshtari, a UNESCO World Heritage Site, is located nearby. Another landmark in the area is the 17th-century Bektashi Demir Baba Tekke, uniting Bektashi, Sunni, Christian and pagan traditions. The oldest active windmill in the country can also be found in Isperih municipality; it was built in the early 19th century. 

American murder victim Senicha Lessman was originally from Isperih.

References

External links
 Gaetica website covering the municipality

Towns in Bulgaria
Populated places in Razgrad Province